Supa may refer to:

Geography
 Supa Dam, Western Ghats, Karnataka, India
 Joida, new settlement for the people from the defunct town Supa. Supa town was immersed due to the construction of Supa Dam
 Supa, Parner, village in Maharashtra, India
Supa, Estonia a village in Southern Estonia.

People
 Hilaria Supa (born 1957), Peruvian politician and human rights activist
 Richard Supa, American songwriter
 Supa, a Slovak rapper, member of Moja Reč